Falseuncaria degreyana, the Breckland conch, is a species of moth of the family Tortricidae. It is found in China (Xinjiang), Mongolia, Russia and most of Europe. The habitat consists of meadows, rural areas, waysides, heathlands, moorlands and farmland.

The wingspan is 13–15 mm.The forewings are fairly narrow and silvery white. There is a 
straight sloping ferruginous median fascia mixed with dark fuscous, the costal end faint and greyish. The termen is slightly darker than the rest of the wing. The hindwings are grey-brown, the termen quite pointed.It is very similar to Falseuncaria ruficiliana.

There are two generations per year, with adults on wing in May and again from mid-June to September.

The larvae feed on the flowers of Plantago, Linaria and Antirrhinum species. The species overwinters as a cocoon.

References

Moths described in 1869
Cochylini